SMITZ is a ska and punk rock band from Honolulu, Hawaii. The group was formed in the summer of 2005 in the heart of Enchanted Lakes in Kailua.  SMITZ is Jonny Random (vocals, rhythm) David Garvin (lead guitar) Taylor Rice (bass) Nic Sticcs (drums). At the beginning of their career there were a multitude of different genres the group experimented with included punk rock, funk, metal, reggae, ska, surf and jazz. Eventually the sound became more focused and direct following in the footsteps of groups like Operation Ivy (band), The Rudiments and Adolescents (band).

Within the next couple years SMITZ started making a name for themselves playing different venues such as Coffee Talk, Anna Banana's, Pink Cadillac, 1739 (Galaxy's), Haleiwa Gym, Waikiki Beach, Detox, Waikiki Sandbox and more. In late 2005 the band took to the studio to record their first album "Burning In". Recording with Demitri Marmash of Buckshot Shorty & Upstanding Youth. The album never saw the light of day because it eventually became unsatisfactory for the group. In 2008 the group decided to re-record "Burning In", but instead title it "Cretin Crossover". The group has come along ways since the first album and they knew the new record would represent the group more accurately than the previous effort. On August 7, 2012, their first official album was released.

SMITZ is still active and residing in Honolulu, Hawaii. They have shared the stage with bands such as Leftöver Crack, Face to Face (punk band), Voodoo Glow Skulls, T.S.O.L., Mephiskapheles and MDC (band)

They released their second album, "Skullduggerous," on October 13, 2017.

Discography
Studio albums
 Cretin Crossover (Album) (2012) (Audio Bento Records)
 Skullduggerous (Album) (2017) (Audio Bento Records)

Compilations
Hawaiian Punk: Volume 3 (Hawaiian Express Records)

References 

"The 808 Scene Zine", An Authentic Representation Of Young Punks In Hawaii, April 3rd, 2006
"The 808 Scene Zine", SMITZ interview, May 24th, 2008
"Honolulu Pulse", Island Mele: ‘Cretin Crossover’

External links 
 "SMITZ Myspace"
 Facebook
 Last.FM

Musical groups from Hawaii
Third-wave ska groups